Orissa is the former name of the state of Odisha in India.

Orissa may also refer to:

Places
 Orissa Subah, a Mughal imperial province
 Bihar and Orissa Province, a province of British India from 1912 to 1936
 Orissa Province, a province of British India from 1936 to 1947
 Orissa Tributary States, a group of princely states of British India

Other uses
 Orissa (film), a 2013 Malayalam film directed by M. Padmakumar
 Orissa cyclone, a 1999 tropical cyclone in the Indian Ocean
 HMIS Orissa (J200), a Bangor-class minesweeper launched in 1941
 Orissa, the name of Odisha cricket team until 2011

See also

 
 Orisha (disambiguation)
 Orissi (disambiguation)
 Odisha (disambiguation)